The London Gazette is one of the official journals of record or government gazettes of the Government of the United Kingdom, and the most important among such official journals in the United Kingdom, in which certain statutory notices are required to be published. The Gazette is not a conventional newspaper offering general news coverage. It does not have a large circulation. Other official newspapers of the UK government are The Edinburgh Gazette and The Belfast Gazette, which, apart from reproducing certain materials of nationwide interest published in The London Gazette, also contain publications specific to Scotland and Northern Ireland, respectively. In turn, The London Gazette carries not only notices of UK-wide interest, but also those relating specifically to entities or people in England and Wales. However, certain notices that are only of specific interest to Scotland or Northern Ireland are also required to be published in The London Gazette.

The London, Edinburgh and Belfast Gazettes are published by TSO (The Stationery Office) on behalf of His Majesty's Stationery Office. They are subject to Crown copyright.

The London Gazette claims to be the oldest surviving English newspaper and the oldest continuously published newspaper in the UK, having been first published on 7 November 1665 as The Oxford Gazette. The claim to being oldest is also made by the Stamford Mercury (1712) and Berrow's Worcester Journal (1690).

Current publication 
The London Gazette is published each weekday, except for bank holidays. Notices for the following, among others, are published:

 Granting of royal assent to bills of the Parliament of the United Kingdom or of the Scottish Parliament
 The issuance of writs of election when a vacancy occurs in the House of Commons
 Appointments to certain public offices
 Commissions in the Armed Forces and subsequent promotion of officers
 Corporate and personal insolvency
 Granting of awards of honours and military medals
 Changes of names or of coats of arms
 Royal proclamations and other declarations

His Majesty's Stationery Office has digitised all issues of the Gazette, and these are available online.

The official Gazettes are published by The Stationery Office. The content, apart from insolvency notices, is available in a number of machine-readable formats, including XML (delivery by email/FTP) and XML/RDFa via Atom feed.

History 

The London Gazette was first published as The Oxford Gazette on 7 November 1665. Charles II and the Royal Court had moved to Oxford to escape the Great Plague of London, and courtiers were unwilling to touch London newspapers for fear of contagion. The Gazette was "Published by Authority" by Henry Muddiman, and its first publication is noted by Samuel Pepys in his diary. The King returned to London as the plague dissipated, and the Gazette moved too, with the first issue of The London Gazette (labelled No. 24) being published on 5 February 1666. The Gazette was not a newspaper in the modern sense: it was sent by post to subscribers, not printed for sale to the general public.

Her Majesty's Stationery Office took over the publication of the Gazette in 1889. Publication of the Gazette was transferred to the private sector in 2006, under government supervision, when HMSO was sold and renamed The Stationery Office.

Dates before 1 January 1752

Until Calendar (New Style) Act 1750 came into effect on 1 January 1752, the Gazette was published with a date based on the Julian calendar with the start of year as 25 March. (Modern secondary sources may adjust the start of the calendar year during this period to 1 January, while retaining the original day and month. Using this adjustment, an issue with a printed date of 24 March 1723 will be reported as being published in 1724 the same solar year as an issue published two days later, on 26 March 1724.)

"Gazetted"
In time of war, dispatches from the various conflicts are published in The London Gazette. People referred to are said to have been mentioned in despatches. When members of the armed forces are promoted, and these promotions are published here, the person is said to have been "gazetted".

Being "gazetted" (or "in the gazette") also meant having official notice of one's bankruptcy published,  as in the classic ten-line poem comparing the stolid tenant farmer of 1722 to the lavishly spending faux-genteel farmers of 1822:

Notices of engagement and marriage were also formerly published in the Gazette.

Colonial gazettes

Gazettes, modelled on The London Gazette, were issued for most British colonial possessions.

See also

 History of British newspapers
 Iris Oifigiúil
 The Dublin Gazette – in Ireland
 London Gazette index
 Official Journal of the European Union
 List of government gazettes

References

External links

 London, Edinburgh and Belfast Gazettes official site
 

1665 establishments in England
Daily newspapers published in the United Kingdom
Government gazettes
London newspapers
National newspapers published in the United Kingdom
Publications established in 1665
The National Archives (United Kingdom)
Westminster system